LogoLounge is a research and networking tool for graphic designers who create corporate identities, or logos.

Members can search the database by keywords provided by the originator, or according to such criteria as designer, color, shape, symbol, client, etc.  Members also bookmark and organize favorite designs in “Collections,” read articles pertaining to the graphic design industry, and connect with other members.

History 
LogoLounge launched in 2002 and was created from a need for an efficient way to find reference material for logos.  The site's founder is corporate identity designer Bill Gardner, president of Gardner Design in Wichita, Kansas.

LogoLounge Books 
Logos submitted to LogoLounge are considered for publication in the affiliated book series Each book features the most recent top 2,000 logos selected by industry judges and organized according to trends and keywords.  As of 2018, LogoLounge Volumes 1, 2, 3, 4, 5, 6, 7 and 8, and Master Library Volumes 1, 2, 3 and 4 have been published by Rockport Publishers. Book 9 was published by HOW Publishing, and Book 10 and all future books will be published by Indicia Press

References 

Companies based in Wichita, Kansas